Cirrhochrista kosemponialis is a moth in the family Crambidae. It was described by Embrik Strand in 1918. It is found in Taiwan and India (Khasi Hills).

References

Moths described in 1918
Spilomelinae
Moths of Taiwan
Moths of Asia